Zelentia fulgens common name shiny aeolid, is a species of sea slug, an aeolid nudibranch, a marine gastropod mollusc in the family Trinchesiidae.

Distribution
This species was described from  Point Pinos, Monterey Bay, California, United States. It has been recorded along the Eastern Pacific coastline of North America from Kayostia Beach, Clallam County, Washington state to Shell Beach, San Luis Obispo, California.

References 

Trinchesiidae
Gastropods described in 1966